First Presbyterian Church is a historic church at 221 Court Street in Portsmouth, Ohio.

The Greek Revival church building was constructed in 1849. It was added to the National Register of Historic Places in 1973.

References

Presbyterian churches in Ohio
Churches on the National Register of Historic Places in Ohio
Greek Revival church buildings in Ohio
Churches completed in 1849
National Register of Historic Places in Scioto County, Ohio
Historic district contributing properties in Ohio
1849 establishments in Ohio
Churches in Portsmouth, Ohio